In the Lap of the Gods may refer to:

 In the Lap of the Gods (novel), the working title of Jeffrey Archer novel Sons of Fortune
 "In the Lap of the Gods", a 1974 song from Queen album Sheer Heart Attack
 "In the Lap of the Gods", a 1978 song from The Alan Parsons Project album Pyramid